Alexander Mackenzie Gray (born 22 November 1957) is a Canadian film, television, and stage actor. He is a dual citizen of the United Kingdom and Canada.  He divides his time between Toronto and Vancouver.

Life and career
Gray was born in Toronto. After studying and working in London, UK, he completed his training at the University of Toronto. He performed in independent films in the UK, but his first North American feature film was The Wars in 1983. A professional actor for over 30 years, he has worked on stage numerous times in Britain, Canada and the United States. He has also appeared in over 130 films and television shows and was a series lead on a major US network. Gray has also done voiceover work for animated series, documentaries and video games. In addition to performing, Gray is a director, writer and producer in film and theatre. He wrote vignettes and "shorts" for several episodes of Sesame Street from 1984 to 1986.

Gray also has a musical background. He was the lead singer and rhythm guitarist of the Toronto rock band The Fridge Stickers.  Mackenzie has composed and recorded many songs, incidental music and scores for films, TV shows and web features. In 2008, he co-produced the award-winning feature film Poe: Last Days of The Raven. He taught Film History at The Art Institute of Vancouver for 5 years and teaches Acting for Film at The University of British Columbia. He was a sitting member of the board of directors of the Academy of Canadian Cinema and Television for 4 years, as well as a voting member. He also served on the Western Gemini 2006 Committee for that year's Gemini Awards.

Gray has appeared multiple times in Superman media, including twice in the television series Smallville, notably as an older clone of Lex Luthor; and as Kryptonian scientist Jax-Ur in Man of Steel. He played Fangtom in the 2011 animated series Ninjago: Masters of Spinjitzu, and also took the lead role of Dr. Hitz in the 2016 short film 2BR02B: To Be or Naught to Be based on the short story by Kurt Vonnegut. He also provided the voice for the main villain, Gramorr, in the first two seasons of LoliRock. Gray also appeared in the 2011 horror film Grave Encounters. In 2016, Gray portrayed Lux Dujour in Dirk Gently's Holistic Detective Agency. In 2017, Gray voiced Dandy Grandeur in the My Little Pony: Friendship Is Magic season seven episode "Fluttershy Leans In". He currently portrays Walter / The Eye on the FX television series Legion.

Filmography

Film

Television

Short films

Awards and nominations
Gray has won 3 Leo awards and been nominated for one on 16 other occasions.

References

External links

1957 births
Canadian male film actors
Living people
Male actors from Toronto
Musicians from Toronto
Canadian male television actors
Canadian male voice actors
Canadian male stage actors
Canadian rock singers
University of Toronto alumni
Academic staff of the University of British Columbia
20th-century Canadian male actors
21st-century Canadian male actors
British male film actors
British male television actors
Canadian rock guitarists
Canadian male guitarists
British rock singers
British rock guitarists
British male guitarists
British male voice actors
British male stage actors
20th-century British male actors
21st-century British male actors